Menemerus guttatus is a jumping spider species in the genus Menemerus that lives in Morocco. It was first described by Wanda Wesołowska in 1999. It is related to Menemerus animatus, Menemerus davidi and Menemerus modestus. The species name derives from the Latin for spotted, .

References

Salticidae
Fauna of Morocco
Spiders of Africa
Spiders described in 1999